John Isner was the defending champion, but withdrew before the tournament began.

Steve Johnson won his fourth career ATP World Tour title, defeating Ramkumar Ramanathan in the final, 7–5, 3–6, 6–2. Ramanathan was making his first appearance in a World Tour final.

Seeds
The top four seeds receive a bye into the second round.

Draw

Finals

Top half

Bottom half

Qualifying

Seeds

Qualifiers

Qualifying draw

First qualifier

Second qualifier

Third qualifier

Fourth qualifier

References

 Main draw
 Qualifying draw

Singles